Tragocephala gorilla is a species of beetle in the family Cerambycidae. It was described by James Thomson in 1857. It is known from Guinea, Uganda, Gabon, and the Democratic Republic of the Congo.

References

gorilla
Beetles described in 1857